Hilary Robinson is a British academic and art theorist. She is Professor of Feminism, Art, and Theory at Loughborough University's School of Social Sciences and Humanities. She was Dean of the School of Art and Design and a professor at Middlesex University, and previously served as Dean of the College of Fine Arts at Carnegie Mellon University. Her research focuses on the history, theory, and practice of feminist art.

Education and career 
Robinson is the daughter of bookbinder Ivor Robinson MBE (28 Oct 1924–19 Feb 2014) and Olive Robinson (née Trask)(5 Apr 1929- ), a teacher. Robinson graduated with a BA Fine Art from Newcastle University. She then received an MA by thesis in Cultural History from the Royal College of Art in London. At the University of Leeds, she obtained her PhD in Art Theory.

In 2005 she became the dean of the College of Fine Arts at Carnegie Mellon University in Pittsburgh, Pennsylvania, where she was chosen to be on the board of several museums, including the Warhol Museum and the Mattress Factory Museum. She returned to England in 2012 to become the dean of the School of Art and Design and Professor of Visual Culture at Middlesex University. She joined Loughborough University's School of Arts, English and Drama in 2017 as Professor of Feminism, Art, and Theory.

Selected publications and exhibitions

Books
 Robinson, Hilary and Buszek, Maria Elena, eds. (2019) A Companion to Feminist Art. Wiley Blackwell, Malden MA; Oxford UK.   
 Robinson, Hilary, Tobin, Amy, and Gosling, Luci; Reckitt, Hellena, ed. (2018) The Art of Feminism: Images that Shaped the Fight for Equality, 1857–2017. Chronicle Books, San Francisco; and Tate Publishing, London.  
 Robinson, Hilary, ed. (2015) Feminism-art-theory 1968–2014: an anthology. Wiley Blackwell, Malden MA; Oxford UK.  
 Robinson, Hilary (2006) Reading art, reading Irigaray: the politics of art by women. I.B. Tauris, London. 
 Robinson, Hilary, ed. (2001) Feminism-art-theory : 1968–2000. Wiley-Blackwell, Oxford.

Book sections
 Robinson, Hilary (2021) 'Not White, Not Male, and Not New York: Race, Feminism and Artists in Pittsburgh'. In Feminist Visual Activism and the Body, edited by Sliwinska, Basia, 14-30. New York and Abingdon: Routledge.
 Robinson, Hilary (2020) 'But does it work in theory? Androcentric blind spots and omissions' In Art and Activism in the Age of Systemic Crisis: Aesthetic Resilience edited by Eliza Steinbock, Bram Ieven, Marijke de Valck, 24-38. New York and Abingdon: Routledge Part of 
 Robinson, Hilary (2019) ‘Witness it: Activism, Art, and the Feminist Performative Subject’ in Buszek and Robinson (eds): A Companion to Feminist Art, pp. 243–260
 Robinson, Hilary (2019) ‘The early work of Griselda Pollock in the context of developing feminist thinking in art history and criticism.’ In Raluca Bibiri (ed) Griselda Pollock: From Feminism to the Concentrationary and Beyond. Special issue: Images, Imagini, Images Journal of Visual and Cultural Studies n. 7 2017. Iași: Institutul European, Romania, pp. 19–50 
 Robinson, Hilary (2012) Pleasure, painting, politics: the three graces – or: why I like Adélaïde Labille-Guiard's Self-Portrait With Two Pupils. In: Artistic Production and the Feminist Theory of Art: New Debates III. Ayuntamiento de Vitoria-Gastiezko Udalak, Victoria-Gastiez, Spain, pp. 306–316. 
 Harley, Alison and James, Stephanie and Reid, Eileen and Reid, Seona and Robinson, Hilary and Watson, Yvonne (2008) The third space: a paradigm for internationalism. In: The Student Experience in Art and Design Higher Education: Drivers for Change. Jill Rogers Associates Ltd, Cambridge, pp. 167–187. 
 Robinson, Hilary and Harley, A. and Reid, E. and Reid, S. and Watson, Y. (2008) The third space: a paradigm for internationalisation. In: The student experience in art and design higher education: drivers for change. Drew, Linda, ed. Jill Rodgers Associates, Cambridge. 
 Robinson, Hilary (2003) Becoming women: Irigaray, Ireland and visual representation. In: Art, Gender and Nation: Ethnic Landscapes, Myths and Mother-Figures. Bhreathnach-Lynch, Sheila and Cusack, Tricia, eds. Ashgate, Aldershot, pp. 113–127. 
 Robinson, Hilary (2000) Whose beauty? Women, art, and inter-subjectivity in Luce Irigaray's writings. In: Beauty Matters. Brand, Peg Zeglin, ed. Indiana University Press, pp. 224–251.

Exhibitions
 Robinson, Hilary (2012–13) Feminist and ..., Mattress Factory, Pittsburgh, PA

Other academic publications 
Journal papers and other academic publications can be found on ORCID https://orcid.org/0000-0002-3153-3788

 Women, feminism, and art schools: The UK experience, Women's Studies International Forum 2021-02-10 DOI: doi.org/10.1016/j.wsif.2021.102447

References

External links
 Personal website https://www.feminism.art
 ORCID ID and full list of academic publications: 
 Hilary Robinson profile page for Loughborough University 
 List of publications Middlesex University Research Repository
 Academia.edu listing
 

Living people
British art curators
Feminist historians
British women historians
Women art historians
British art historians
Carnegie Mellon University faculty
Alumni of Newcastle University
Alumni of the University of Leeds
Year of birth missing (living people)